The Australian Citizens Party (ACP), formerly the Citizens Electoral Council of Australia (CEC), is a minor political party in Australia affiliated with the international LaRouche Movement which was led by American political activist and conspiracy theorist Lyndon LaRouche.

The party has pushed conspiracy theories, including that international action on climate change and indigenous land rights are part of a conscious fraud masterminded by Prince Philip, as part of the British Royal Family’s scheme to depopulate the planet. It ‘believes Prince Philip is trying to break up nation-states through the World Wide Fund for Nature and is involved in a "racist plot to splinter Australia"’.

Founded in 1988, the party has been led by Craig Isherwood ever since.

History 
The original CEC was established in 1988 by residents of the Kingaroy region of Queensland. CEC candidate Trevor Perrett won the 1988 Barambah state by-election in Queensland, after former Queensland Premier Sir Joh Bjelke-Petersen resigned from State Parliament in 1987. However, Perrett switched to the National Party in December 1988. Members of the Australian League of Rights, an extreme right-wing group led by Eric Butler, tried unsuccessfully to take over the new party. Its purpose was to lobby for binding voter-initiated referendums.

By 1989, the CEC leadership was under the influence of the Lyndon LaRouche movement. By 1992, the CEC identified itself as the Australian branch of the broad international LaRouche movement. National Secretary Craig Isherwood moved the headquarters from rural Queensland to a Melbourne suburb, with direct communications links to LaRouche's US headquarters established.

In 1996, then-Liberal Party MP Ken Aldred, was disendorsed by the Liberal Party after using parliamentary privilege to make allegations of involvement in espionage and drug trafficking against a prominent Jewish lawyer and a senior foreign affairs official, using documents that were later found to be forged, supplied to him by the CEC.

In 2004, the CEC received the largest contribution of any political party, $862,000 from a central Queensland cattle farmer and former CEC candidate named Ray Gillham. The party collected $2.3 million in donations in 2020-21. The party’s leader is National Secretary and National Treasurer Craig Isherwood of Melbourne, who has been an election candidate for the party numerous times.

Platform 
The ACP has lobbied for "the establishment of a National Bank and State Banks to provide loans at 2% or less to agriculture (family farms), industry and for infrastructure development", launching a petition in 2002 to drive support with a full page advertisement in The Australian newspaper. In early 2008 the CEC started campaigning for a "Bank Homeowners Protection Bill of 2008", calling for legislation in the spirit of the Australian moratorium laws enacted in the 1920s and 1930s.

The party follows the LaRouche line of climate change denial towards the theory of anthropogenic global warming, referring to fears of global warming as "Hitler-Nazi race science". The party espouses the claim that the Port Arthur massacre, in which Martin Bryant murdered 35 people and injured 37 others, was instigated by mental health institute the Tavistock Institute on the orders of the royal family, and that the Australian Liberal Party was founded by pro-Hitler fascists.

The CEC's policies have included introducing a national Glass-Steagall Act to "break up the banks", establishing a national bank, introducing a moratorium on home & farm foreclosures, constructing high speed rail and the Bradfield Scheme, joining China's Belt and Road Initiative, shutting down Pine Gap and opposing the existence of climate change among others.

Criticism 
The Anti-Defamation Commission of the Australian branch of B'nai B'rith (an international Jewish organisation) has published a Briefing Paper with details of the CEC's alleged antisemitic, anti-gay, anti-Aboriginal and racist underpinnings. The document cites CEC publications and quotes former CEC members. The CEC in turn has published a response to the ADC's accusations and described the ADC "as a front for Queen Elizabeth's Privy Council, the ruling body of the British Commonwealth". This allegation, that there is a link between the ADC and the alleged power of the Privy Council, has been attributed to the fact that Sir Zelman Cowen, a former Governor-General of Australia and a member of the Privy Council, was a member of the ADC's board of advisors.

Former members of the CEC and families of current members have accused the group of "brainwashing" members and engaging in campaigns involving "dirty tricks". For example, former CEC staffer Donald Veitch has claimed that new recruits undergo "deprogramming sessions" and that recruits are probed for sexual peccadilloes. Veitch has stated: "The mind control operations commenced by Lyndon LaRouche in the USA in the mid-1970s are still being practised today within his movement in Australia".

The Australian Citizens party engages in climate change denial.

Electoral results 

Despite running in "almost every election of the past two decades", in no election has the CEC ever garnered more than 2% of the vote.

At the 2007 federal election, the CEC's previous form continued. Its first preference votes in the lower house was 27,879 (0.22%), and 8,677 (0.07%) in the upper house, both results were 0.14% down from 2004.

At the 2016 federal election, CEC fielded senate candidates in every state and the Northern Territory and  seven candidates for seats in the House of Representatives.  Nationally, the party received 5,175 votes (0.04%) in the lower house and 9,850 votes (0.07%) in the upper house.

See also 
:Category:Australian Citizens Party politicians
 Political parties in Australia

References

External links 
 Official website

1988 establishments in Australia
LaRouche movement
Political parties in Australia
Political parties established in 1988